"Heartbreak" is a 2009 melodic dance single produced, recorded and co-written by British/Israeli musician Matt Schwartz under the guise of M'Black, and features vocals by British/American singer, and co-writer, Nicol (AKA Nicole Dash Jones). This track is Schwartz's first US number-one single on Billboard's Hot Dance Airplay chart, even though he has charted under different guises.

In the United Kingdom, the single was released through iTunes on March 16, 2010 with additional remixes.

Track listing
CD Maxi-Single
 "Heartbreak" (M'Black Radio Edit) 3:31
 "Heartbreak" (Original) 4:08
 "Heartbreak" (M'Black Extended Mix)  5:46    
 "Heartbreak" (Original Extended Mix)  6:30  
 "Heartbreak" (The Drill Mix)  6:45  
 "Heartbreak" (Eyegate Mix)  7:17  
 "Heartbreak" (Felix Baumgartner Mix)  7:25  
 "Heartbreak" (Inner Smile Mix)  8:37  
 "Heartbreak" (Ron May Mix)  6:55   
 "Heartbreak" (Caged Baby Mix)  8:34
 "Heartbreak" (Bare Noize Mix)  4:01

Release history

Chart performance

Weekly charts

Year-end charts

References

2009 singles
2010 singles
2009 songs
Songs written by Matt Schwartz